Springersville is an unincorporated community in Waterloo Township, Fayette County, Indiana.

History
Springersville was laid out in 1840. A post office was established at Springersville in 1840, and remained in operation until it was discontinued in 1853.

Springersville Cemetery established 1837 as a Cemetery Association and still exists today as the Springersville Cemetery Association.

Geography

References

Unincorporated communities in Fayette County, Indiana
Unincorporated communities in Indiana